Penicillium montanense is an anamorph species of the genus of Penicillium which produces tannase.

References

Further reading 
 
 

montanense
Fungi described in 1962